KCAC may refer to:

 Kansas City Athletic Club, an athletic club in Kansas City, Kansas 
 Kansas Collegiate Athletic Conference, an NAIA collegiate athletic conference based in Kansas
 Kovalchick Convention and Athletic Complex, a convention and athletic center at Indiana University of Pennsylvania
 KCAC (FM), a radio station (89.5 FM) licensed to Camden, Arkansas, United States
 KCAC (AM), a radio station (1010 AM) in Phoenix, Arizona, 1969–71
 Knesset Christian Allies Caucus, a caucus within the Israeli Knesset